Masum Reza is a Bangladeshi playwright, television drama and stage play director. He is best known for writing the screenplay of the television drama serial Ronger Manush (2004). In 2016, he won Bangla Academy Literary Award in the drama category. He wrote screenplay for films including Meghla Akash (2002), Molla Barir Bou (2005), Bapjaner Bioscope (2015) and Hason Raja (2017). In 2010, he published two novels.

Career
Reza debuted in direction in Chand Alir Documentary, a street play, in Kushtia in 1979. He has been associated with the theater troupe Desh Natok since 1988. His full-fledged stage play is Birsa Kabya. He first wrote the screenplay for the television drama Koitab.

Works
Stage plays
 Surgaon (2017)
 Kuhokjal (2014)
 NityaPurana (2001)

Television dramas
 Ronger Manush (2004)
 Megh Rang Meye (2005)
 Saat Sawdagor (2013)
 The Village Engineer (2016)

Films
 Meghla Akash (2002)
 Molla Barir Bou (2005)
 Bapjaner Bioscope (2015)
 Hason Raja (2017)

Novels
 Meen Konna-do (2010)
 Goalkeeper (2010)

Awards
 Bachsas Award (2003)
 Zakaria Smrity Padak (2004)
 Meril Prothom Alo Awards for Best Playwright (2006)
 Bangla Academy Literary Award (2016)
 National Film Awards (Bangladesh) (2017)

References

External links

Living people
People from Kushtia District
University of Rajshahi alumni
Bangladeshi dramatists and playwrights
Bangladeshi male novelists
Recipients of Bangla Academy Award
Best Screenplay National Film Award (Bangladesh) winners
Year of birth missing (living people)
People from Khulna
Best Story National Film Award (Bangladesh) winners